The Binga are an ethnic group living in the South Sudanese state of Western Bahr el Ghazal and in Darfur. They speak a dialect of Yulu.

References

Ethnic groups in South Sudan